The Quarmer, a.k.a. the Sand Superman, is a fictional character from DC Comics, created by Denny O'Neil and Curt Swan. He was a living sand doppelganger of Superman and first appeared in Superman #233 (January 1971) in "The Sandman Saga", the first issue that introduced the Bronze Age-era Superman.

Fictional origin
Somewhere in the deserts of the United States there was a reactor in which experiments were conducted on pieces of kryptonite. When a powerful nuclear meltdown happened, Superman himself was there to attempt to stop it. He failed, however, and a powerful kryptonite-based explosion that rendered Superman unconscious resulted. Although he apparently had succeeded in stopping most of the deadly radiation from reaching humanity, a strange fission wave reached around the world and changed all kryptonite into pure iron. Miraculously, it seemed, Superman now had no vulnerabilities anymore, a fact that was told in newspapers worldwide.

On the spot Superman had been lying in the desert unconscious after the explosion was formed the imprint of the Man of Steel. The explosion had mysteriously opened up a portal into another dimension called the Quarrm Dimension. In that dimension beings existed as non-corporeal spirits and, like most spirits, they wanted a physical form to accompany them. One of the beings of that dimension gained access to the ordinary DC Earth by attaching itself to the psychic and physical imprint of Superman left in the sand. Many hours after the explosion an uncanny version of Superman, made of sand, rose from the imprint.

This being would in the months that followed meet Superman seemingly randomly and drain power from him in an attempt to create an identity for itself. Superman was left near powerless after each such encounter, while the Sand Superman grew more and more powerful and humanoid. Its presence became more and more of an annoyance to Superman, who wanted to know what it was. It could, however not speak, and mostly left more mysterious than it had been before the encounter. Superman, powerless at those occasions, was unable to follow it.

During one of these encounters, it saved the life of Superman by destroying the magic weapon called the Devil's Harp, an artifact that was being used by a man named Ferlin Nyxly a.k.a. Pan. Pan had nearly killed Superman when the Sand Superman sneaked by and destroyed the weapon that had allowed Pan to steal all of Superman's powers. Reasonably, the Sand Superman saved Superman's life in order to maintain its own existence (it had a life-giving mental link to Superman and thus it could not survive without Superman being alive). Later it gained the ability to speak, but that did not help Superman much. The being did not follow human emotions and did not care for humanity; thus Superman could not convince it to agree on anything.

When the situation got even worse, Superman was left completely without powers. Seeking help from one of Wonder Woman's old friends, the Asian mystic called I Ching, Superman hoped to cure his situation. I Ching sent away Superman's soul to regain all the powers he had lost, which it did, leaving the Sand Superman powerless and near dead. Attempting to return home to Quarrm in order to survive, the Sand Superman opened up a dimensional portal in a park in Metropolis. Superman was too weak to enter the portal. The portal remained open. Superman had, unfortunately, been given brain damage by a powerful blow to his head while un-powered. When his powers had now returned he retained the brain damage, which made him act rashly and unreasonably. Superman had now become an irresponsible and potentially lethal superbeing.

With kryptonite no longer available, I Ching and Wonder Woman had to decide on a risky plan to help Superman; they tracked down the Sand Superman and made an agreement with Superman to meet him so that the Sand Superman could ambush it, draining all his powers. Powerless, Superman would then recover as a normal man. Before the Sand Superman could steal Superman's powers, it was spotted and Superman escaped the scene. Meanwhile, another being from Quarrm had entered the Earth Dimension via the portage in the park. This being fused itself with a giant Chinese statue of a monster and began rampaging in the streets. Superman accidentally flew over this creature and was completely drained of power, leaving him unconscious and powerless. Some street punks found Superman, gave him a real beating and allied themselves with the Chinese monster Quarrmian. The monster, seeking advice, did everything the punks asked of it. They wanted to finish off Superman, who was now residing in a hospital, and thus went there sitting on the back of the monster.

The punks were, however, too bullying and the enraged monster killed both of them, crushing them in its hands. The monster still wanted to finish Superman (to which he also seemed to have a mental link), but by the time it reached the hospital, Superman awoke re-powered. The Sand Superman showed up and teamed with Superman. Together they both attacked the monster who, terrified, escaped back to the park and left Earth via the dimensional portal. Alone again with Superman, the Sand Superman announced that he was going to kill Superman so that he could be the only Man of Steel (see Quote). I Ching, fortunately, arrived on the scene and magically hypnotized both into seeing how a fight between the two might turn out. Both saw the fight destroying Earth and Superman, believing that he had really destroyed Earth, was devastated. The Sand Superman realized that it had no right to claim Superman's body or soul and thus agreed to return home to Quarrm. It left through the portage with half of Superman's powers (Superman refused to take the other half back after having seen the destruction of Earth during the hypnotism) and closed the portal from the Quarrm side.

Long after that, he was seen in an issue of DC Collector's Edition: Superman vs. Shazam. The Sand Superman was impersonating the real Man of Steel and attacked Captain Marvel, while Black Adam pretended to be Marvel and ambushed Superman, all to bring about a battle between the two heroes. Presumably the Sand Superman returned to the Quarrm Dimension after the matter was settled. He has probably not been seen since.

After this history, more kryptonite rained down on Earth later on, so the effect was only temporary.

Description
The Sand Superman resembled Superman himself more and more the more power it absorbed. At first it was a pile of sand with humanoid features, but near the end it had acquired colors in its densely packed sand so that it really resembled Superman. The only real difference was that the Sand Superman had a very different and alien body language and that his skin and suit resembled rough sandpaper. Everywhere Superman had colors in his suit, it had too; it even had blue eyes of blue sand and black sand for hair. The entire appearance was quite uncanny and people who saw it often commented how strange 'Superman' looked. All in all, it had the exact appearance of Superman himself, but with a very sand-like composition.

The Sand Superman's personality was very strange and alien. Its main driving force seemed to be pure survival, for which it would do anything. In time it also acquired some of Superman's own personality, including the desire to help humans and be a hero. It desired uniqueness nearly as much as survival itself, and would in the end attempt to kill Superman (something Superman would not do) to take his place. In speech it was sometimes very aggressive, intimidating, while other times it could be filled with self-pity (particularly if powerless). It was very stoic and never showed any human emotion. Its logic was non-human and uncomprehensive.

While claiming that it wanted to take Superman's place, it did not really care about what happened to humans or Earth. Only the final realization of what was right and what was wrong led it to leave Earth and its claims to be Superman. Since it has not returned from Quarrm, it has also shown a great belief in its judgement and a great persistence.

Inspiration
Back in 1971, DC heralded a big change coming to Superman comics, and it was Denny O'Neil who would be penning the newest chapter in the Man of Steel's history. The idea was to strip Superman of some of his power, humanizing him in the process and allowing for a new level of "realistic" (relatively speaking) storytelling. His story, which kicked off with "Kryptonite Nevermore," but which has been nicknamed "The Sandman Saga", is about to be published as a hardcover edition by DC.

The result of the fight between Superman and the Quarmer implied that the Man of Steel would be devoid of half of his power, but later writers would gradually reintroduce Superman's Silver Age powers. This fallacy could imply other Kryptonian characters, such as Krypto and Supergirl, could have also infinite power and similar but perhaps slightly lesser power levels in relation to Superman.

Powers and abilities
The Quarmer could drain and make use of Superman's powers, gradually becoming a Superman clone. He also could sense the whereabouts of Superman.

See also
The Weird

References

Comics characters introduced in 1971
Characters created by Dennis O'Neil
Clone characters in comics
Fictional characters with absorption or parasitic abilities
DC Comics characters who can move at superhuman speeds
DC Comics characters with superhuman strength